The Akwa Ibom State Ministry of Transport and Petroleum is the Nigerian state government ministry charged with the responsibility to plan, devise, and implement state policies on transportation and petroleum.

References 

Government ministries of Akwa Ibom State
Akwa Ibom